Many factories in Malta are located in one of the several industrial estates throughout the archipelago. Malta Industrial Parks is a company which was created to manage industrial estates in Malta.

Major Industrial Areas
The industrial estates include:
 Attard Industrial Estate near Attard
 Bulebel Industrial Estate near Żejtun
 Ħal Far Industrial Estate near Birżebbuġa
 Kordin Industrial Estate near Paola
 Luqa Industrial Estate near Luqa
 Marsa Industrial Estate near Marsa
 Ricasoli Industrial Estate near Kalkara (now defunct because of Smart City Malta)
 San Ġwann Industrial Estate near San Ġwann
 Xewkija Industrial Estate near Xewkija, Gozo

Other Industrial Areas
 Mosta Industrial Estate in Mosta
 Ta' Maġġi in Żabbar
 Ta' Dbieġi in Għarb, Gozo
 Ta' Qali in Attard
 Albert Town in Marsa
 Tal-Ħandaq in Qormi
 Mrieħel near Qormi/Birkirkara

Bulebel Industrial Estate
Bulebel Industrial Estate is one of the major industrial estates in Malta. Its namesake comes from milk production. Among the factories located here are:
 De La Rue, which produces physical currency for various nations.
 ACMA INOX and Metal, a metalworking company
 The Food Factory, a food production plant.
The estate is found on the outskirts of Żejtun, near the localities of Tarxien and Fgura, and is not far from Malta International Airport.

References

External links
 Malta Industrial Parks, Ltd.